Karves (or Karvi) were a small type of longship with broad hull, somewhat similar to the ocean-going knarr cargo ships. Karves were used for both war and ordinary transport, carrying people, goods or livestock. Because they were able to navigate in very shallow water, they were also used for coasting.

The Tune ship from Norway is an example of a historical Karve ship.

Notes 

Viking ships
Merchant sailing ship types
Naval sailing ship types